The Division of Bowman is an Australian Electoral Division in Queensland.

Geography
Since 1984, federal electoral division boundaries in Australia have been determined at redistributions by a redistribution committee appointed by the Australian Electoral Commission. Redistributions occur for the boundaries of divisions in a particular state, and they occur every seven years, or sooner if a state's representation entitlement changes or when divisions of a state are malapportioned.

History

The division was created in 1949 and is named for David Bowman, an early leader of the Australian Labor Party, in Queensland. The seat consists of the entirety of Redland City, located in the eastern suburbs of Brisbane, and includes the suburbs of Capalaba, Cleveland, Redland Bay, Birkdale, Thorneside, Alexandra Hills, Thornlands, Mount Cotton, Ormiston, Wellington Point and Victoria Point. The division also incorporates various islands of Moreton Bay including Coochiemudlo Island, the inhabited southern Bay Islands (Russell, Karragarra, Macleay and Lamb) and the big tourist destination of North Stradbroke Island.

It is generally a residential electorate with some crops, poultry, various light industries and tourism.

Bowman has traditionally been a highly marginal seat, regularly changing hands between the Australian Labor Party and the Liberal Party. Notably, the electorate has been won by the party with the largest national two party preferred vote at every election from 1954 to 2001 (except 1990). However, in the 2004 election, an energetic campaign by Dr Andrew Laming, and an electoral redistribution (due to the creation of the new Division of Bonner, leading veteran Bowman MP Con Sciacca to contest this new seat), saw Bowman returned to the Liberal Party by a significant margin (59.12% 2PP). The division was then considered by pollsters such as Antony Green to be a fairly safe Liberal seat.

In the 2007 election, the electorate experienced a strong swing of 8.86% towards the Australian Labor Party; the incumbent Laming held the seat by 0.04%, or 64 votes. This made it second only to McEwen as the most marginal seat in the country, although the 2009 electoral redistribution in Queensland saw the margin notionally reduced further, to effectively 0.005%, making Bowman Australia's most marginal seat at the time. Laming went on to retain the seat comfortably for the Liberal National Party of Queensland in: 2010, regaining ground with a 9.51% swing towards him; 2013, despite a 6.35% swing against him; and 2016, when all parties saw a positive swing in Bowman (for the first time since 1955), due to the absence of a Palmer United Party candidate.

Members

Election results

References

External links
 Division of Bowman (Qld) — Australian Electoral Commission

Electoral divisions of Australia
Constituencies established in 1949
1949 establishments in Australia
Federal politics in Queensland